The King's Regiment of Foot was a Royal Danish Army infantry regiment. On 1 November 1961, it was amalgamated with the Jutlandic Regiment of Foot, to create the King's Jutlandic Regiment of Foot.

History
From its creation, the regiment has been one of the most used in the Danish army.

It participated with bravery in the 1670s during the Skåne War. In the years before and after 1700 it was in foreign service. It fought in the Great Northern War and participated in Copenhagen's Defense Forces of 1807, and was part of all important battles in the Three Years' War (Bow, Schleswig, Dybbøl 1848), Fredericia 1849 and Isted 1850.

It fought at Dybbøl during the entire siege of 1864. On 18 of April the regiment stood on the left flank, where it took enormous losses as it sought to intercept the German attack of which had just its center of attack, where the regiment stood.

The Footmen's Pioneer command participated with honors in the battles against the German invasion forces 9 of April 1940 was merged in 1951 with King's Regiment of Foot.

Names of the regiment

Standards

References
 Lærebog for Hærens Menige, Hærkommandoen, marts 1960

Danish Army regiments
Military units and formations established in 1675
Military units and formations disestablished in 1961